X Games Austin 2014 was an action sporting event that took place over June 5–8, 2014, at the Circuit of the Americas in Austin, Texas. Another Venue used for the event was the Austin 360 Amphitheater.

While the Summer X Games in past years was typically held in California, this was the first full X Games event to be held in the state of Texas; in 2003, a special "Global Championships" event was held in San Antonio, Texas.  The games were originally announced to be held on May 15–18, but were slipped to the next month, the reason given by ESPN was for a more favorable broadcast window.

X Games Austin gained a 4-day attendance of 160,000 and an all-time total of 5,069,115. It was also announced on the ESPN broadcast that next year's X Games will again be hosted in Austin, Texas and that a new event, Moto X Flat Track will make its debut.

Results

Moto X

Skateboarding

BMX

Rallying & Off-Road Truck

MLG X Games Invitational COD: Ghosts

This X Games also awarded medals for E-Sports for the first time in a Call of Duty: Ghosts tournament co-organized by Major League Gaming. Eight teams participated – the top three finishers from the 2014 COD Championship and the remaining five COD Pro Points top scorers.

Medal table

Highlights
BMXer Jamie Bestwick won his ninth consecutive gold medal in BMX Vert event. At 14 years of age, Skateboarder Tom Schaar becomes the youngest to win the Skateboarding Big Air event, pulling off a 900 at the top of the massive ramp. Skaterboarder Nyjah Huston ties the highest score ever in the Skateboarding Street event in X Games history.

See also
 Fun Fun Fun Fest

References

External links
X Games Austin 2014 – Official ESPN website

X Games
Festivals in Austin, Texas
2014 in American sports
2014 in rallying
2014 in motorcycle sport
2014 in multi-sport events
2014 in sports in Texas
2014 in esports
Sports in Austin, Texas
June 2014 sports events in the United States